Rue de l'Église is a common road name in France and Belgium. The literal translation is street or avenue of the Church.

Belgium 
Rue de l'Église is the most common street name in Belgium. Brussels has two:

 Rue de l'Église, Berchem-Sainte-Agathe

France 
In France, Rue de l'Église is the most used street name before Place de l'Église (Church Place) and Grande Rue. La Poste lists nearly 8,000: 20% of French communes have a route named in this way.

Streets with the name in France include:

 
 
 
 

See also 
 Church Street (disambiguation)
 Street or road name

Street names
Odonyms referring to religion
Odonyms referring to a building